Aghasi Manukyan (27 February 1967 – 19 March 2018) was an Armenian Greco-Roman wrestler. He was a World Cup winner and World Champion. Manukyan earned the Honoured Master of Sports of the USSR Master of Sports of International Class title in 1987.

Biography
Aghasi Manukyan was born 27 February 1967 in Leninakan (now Gyumri), Soviet Armenia. He started wrestling in 1977 under the coaching of Aram Sargsyan. In 1984 he won the Espoir European Championships and in 1987 he won the Espoir World Championships. Manukyan was recruited into the USSR national Greco-Roman wrestling team in 1988. That same year, he came in first place at the Wrestling World Cup team competition.

After Armenia gained its independence from the Soviet Union, Manukyan began representing his native country. Manukyan won a gold medal at the 1993 World Wrestling Championships in his debut as an Armenian wrestler. Manukyan was the first ever wrestler from the independent Republic of Armenia to become a Wrestling World Champion in either Greco-Roman or freestyle wrestling. He was also the second athlete to become a World Champion under the flag of Armenia, after Nshan Munchyan. Manukyan won two silver medals at the European Wrestling Championships in 1994 and 1995. He also competed at the 1996 Summer Olympics in Atlanta.

In 1996, he finished his wrestling career and began coaching. Manukyan coached the Armenian national junior Greco-Roman wrestling team from 1998 to 1999. From 2001 to 2004, he worked in the Sports Committee of the Shirak region of Armenia. In 2006, he moved to the United States. After 2011, he worked at the Olympic training center located in Marquette.

Personal life
Aghasi has two brothers who are also wrestlers. His brother Michael (born 1964) was a Soviet Champion and European Youth Champion of the USSR in Greco-Roman wrestling and his brother Samvel (born 1974) was a Champion of Armenia and fellow Olympian at the 1996 Summer Olympics.

References

External links
 
 
 
 Aghasi Manukyan at Northern Michigan University - National Training Site

1967 births
2018 deaths
Sportspeople from Gyumri
Soviet male sport wrestlers
Armenian male sport wrestlers
Wrestlers at the 1996 Summer Olympics
Olympic wrestlers of Armenia
World Wrestling Championships medalists
European Wrestling Championships medalists